Kinassery is a village in Palakkad district of Kerala state, India. It is close by the village of Koduvayur.

References

Villages in Palakkad district